Benjamin Kimutai Koskei (born September 5, 1971) is a male long-distance runner from Kenya. He has born in Keiyo district of Kenya. He won the 2002 edition of the Amsterdam Marathon, clocking 2:07:26.

Achievements

References

External links

marathoninfo

1971 births
Living people
Kenyan male long-distance runners
Place of birth missing (living people)